Veerasammy Permaul (born 11 August 1989) is a Guyanese professional cricketer. He's featured as a left arm orthodox spinner for both Guyana and the West Indies cricket teamPermaul is also the leading wicket-taker in West Indian First-Class cricketing tournaments.

Career
From Berbice, Permaul has played his club cricket with  Community Centre Cricket Club since 2002. He made his first-class cricket debut for Guyana in the Regional Four Day Competition in 2006/07. In 2012 he captained the West Indies A team in a series at home against India A.

After being released at the end of the 2016 Caribbean Premier League season, he was reselected by the Guyana Amazon Warriors for the 2017 edition; he was picked in the 9th round of the draft.

In March 2017, he was named in the West Indies squad for the Twenty20 International (T20I) series against Pakistan.

In December 2017, he took his 25th five-wicket haul in first-class cricket, bowling for Guyana against the Leeward Islands in the 2017–18 Regional Four Day Competition. He finished the tournament as the leading wicket-taker, with 50 dismissals from 10 matches.

In March 2018, he was named in the West Indies squad for their Twenty20 International (T20I) series against Pakistan. He made his T20I debut for the West Indies against Pakistan on 1 April 2018. However, he injured himself during the match and was ruled out of the West Indies squad for the remaining two fixtures.

In October 2019, he was named in Guyana's squad for the 2019–20 Regional Super50 tournament. In February 2020, in the 2019–20 West Indies Championship fixture against Jamaica, Permaul took 15 wickets for 77 runs in the match. These were the second-best match figures in a domestic first-class match in the West Indies since 1966. He was the leading wicket-taker in the tournament, with fifty dismissals in eight matches.

In July 2020, he was named in the Jamaica Tallawahs squad for the 2020 Caribbean Premier League.

References

External links
 

Living people
1989 births
Guyanese cricketers
West Indies Test cricketers
West Indies One Day International cricketers
West Indies Twenty20 International cricketers
Indo-Guyanese people
Guyana Amazon Warriors cricketers
Guyana cricketers
Sportspeople of Indian descent